"Neon Moon" is a song written by Ronnie Dunn and recorded by American country music duo Brooks & Dunn. It was released in February 1992 as the third single from their debut album Brand New Man. The song became their third consecutive number one single on the country charts. It was also their first single not to have an accompanying music video.

Content
The song's narrator is a man who is at a bar, feeling brokenhearted because his significant other has left, so he “spend[s] most every night beneath the light of a neon moon."

Cover versions
Country music singer Carrie Underwood covered the song from The Last Rodeo Tour.

On December 18, 2018, American dream pop band Cigarettes After Sex released a cover version to streaming platforms.

A newly recorded version by Brooks & Dunn featuring American country singer Kacey Musgraves appeared on the duo's 2019 duet album, Reboot, released on April 5, 2019. Musgraves also performed the song on several dates of her 2018-2019 Oh, What a World: Tour.

Kelly Clarkson covered the song with Gwen Stefani, John Legend, and Blake Shelton in the first season of The Kelly Clarkson Show as a Kellyoke which aired on November 21, 2019.

Dave Audé covered the song with Cody Belew released June 17, 2022.

Chart positions

Year-end charts

References

1992 singles
Brooks & Dunn songs
Kacey Musgraves songs
Songs written by Ronnie Dunn
Song recordings produced by Don Cook
Song recordings produced by Scott Hendricks
Arista Nashville singles
1991 songs